Frampton is the fourth studio album by English rock musician Peter Frampton, released in 1975. It was his last studio release before he went on tour and recorded his live album Frampton Comes Alive!. The most popular songs from the album are "Show Me the Way" and "Baby, I Love Your Way", which became big hits when released as singles from Frampton Comes Alive! The album peaked #32 on the US Billboard 200.

Background
Frampton left Humble Pie because that group fell into a loud, hard rock groove that overwhelmed the technical skills he had spent years working on as a guitarist; he poured a lot of that into this highly melodic mid-tempo rock album.

Frampton's band experienced changes when keyboardist and rhythm guitar player Andy Bown decided to leave the group after a year, and once again focus on his solo career, and bassist Rick Wills decided to leave the group while touring to spend more time with his family and his baby. For this album Bown played bass, with all keyboards and guitars played by Frampton. Subsequently Frampton recruited Americans Bob Mayo (keyboards, guitars, vocals) and Stanley Sheldon (bass, vocals) for his touring band, and this group recorded the hugely successful Frampton Comes Alive live album during 1975.

The album took three weeks to write. In October 1974, Frampton recorded at Clearwell Castle in Gloucestershire, with Ronnie Lane's Mobile Studio parked outside. Additional overdubs were undertaken subsequently at Olympic Studios in London.

Album information
On the album, Frampton composes in a wide range of styles, both instrumentally and vocally. The compositions feature acoustic and electric guitar textures, as apparent on "The Crying Clown", and the acoustic instrumental "Penny For Your Thoughts." Also, "Nowhere's Too Far (For My Baby)" and "Day's Dawning" are examples of melodic arena rock on the album.

Frampton's work on the album did much to enhance his reputation as a solo artist. The album went to #32 on the Billboard 200 album chart, setting the stage for his 1975 tour which would produce the blockbuster success of his double live LP Frampton Comes Alive!.

Record World called the single "(I'll Give You) Money" a "perfect synthesis of hard rock chording and bittersweet vocals with Peter's innate sense of harmony and timing leaving a warm afterglow."

Track listing

All songs written by Peter Frampton.

Side one
 "Day's Dawning" – 3:55
 "Show Me the Way" – 4:02
 "One More Time" – 3:19
 "The Crying Clown" – 4:03
 "Fanfare" – 3:28

Side two
 "Nowhere's Too Far (for My Baby)" – 4:18
 "Nassau" – 1:07 / "Baby, I Love Your Way" – 4:42
 "Apple of Your Eye" – 3:41
 "Penny for Your Thoughts" – 1:27
 "(I'll Give You) Money" – 4:34

Personnel 
Peter Frampton – lead vocals, guitar, acoustic guitar, piano, organ, talkbox, bass on "Baby I Love Your Way"
Andy Bown – bass
John Siomos – drums, percussion

Additional personnel
Poli Palmer – vibraphone on "The Crying Clown"

Production
Producer: Peter Frampton, Chris Kimsey
Engineer: Chris Kimsey, Andy Knight
Mixing: George Marino
Mastering: George Marino, Doug Sax, Arnie Acosta
Art Direction: Vartan, Roland Young, Junie Osaki
Photography: Mike Zagaris
Supervisor: Beth Stempel, Bill Levenson
Coordination: Beth Stempel, Bill Levenson
Management: Dee Anthony

Charts
Album

Certifications

References

Peter Frampton albums
1975 albums
A&M Records albums
Albums produced by Peter Frampton